Fokus TV is a Polish television channel launched on April 28, 2014. It was established for the purpose of the first DTT multiplex (MUX 1).

On December 4, 2017, Polsat announced that it had bought 34%, bought on February 2, 15.46%, reaching 49% of shares in TV Spektrum, the broadcaster of Fokus TV and Nowa TV.

Programming 
The programming schedule consists mainly of documentaries, reality shows, popular science magazines, TV series and movies.

Series TV 
Hell On Wheels
The Tudors
Bomb Girls
Borgia
Pat & Mat
Storage Wars
Pawn Stars

References

External links
 Official Site 

Television channels in Poland
Television channels and stations established in 2014